Ünal Aysal (born 2 June 1941) is a Turkish businessman. He was the chairman of Galatasaray S.K.

Business career
He graduated from Galatasaray High School in 1961. He then studied law at Istanbul University and later at University of Neuchâtel in Switzerland.

Aysal worked with Koç Holding in 1970-72 as the coordinator of the Ram Foreign Trade company and established the Unit International firm in 1974 in Brussels, Belgium. Aysal has been involved in the oil business and electric power industry, since 1984. He is currently the head of the Unit Group, which comprises 23 companies. He was honored in 1999 by the President of Turkey as the best representative of Turkish businesses abroad. As of 2011, his net worth is around $1 billion.

Galatasaray S.K.
On 14 May 2011, Aysal replaced Adnan Polat to become the 34th president of Galatasaray, with a record of highest majority of votes in the 106-year-history of Galatasaray, winning 2998 of the 4019 votes cast. The previous record was set by outgoing Adnan Polat, who won 2944 of the 5234 votes during the chairmanship election in March 2008. Aysal's main target was to turn the fortunes of the club's Football team around, as well as changing the club's financial fortunes around. He brought in Former Coach Fatih Terim with which the club has achieved previous Domestic and European success to lead the shake up of the squad to help compete at the highest level again.

Trophies won by club during presidency

Football
 Süper Lig (2): 2011–12, 2012–13
 Süper Kupa (2): 2012, 2013
 Türkiye Kupası (1): 2013–14

Men's Basketball
 Turkish Basketball League (1): 2012–2013

Women's Basketball
 EuroLeague Women (1): 2013-14
 Turkish Women's Basketball League (1): 2013-2014
 Turkish Women's Cup Basketball (3): 2011–2012, 2012–2013, 2013–2014
 Turkish President Cup (1): 2011-12

See also
 List of Galatasaray S.K. presidents

References

1941 births
Living people
Galatasaray S.K. presidents
Galatasaray High School alumni
Istanbul University Faculty of Law alumni
Businesspeople from Istanbul
University of Neuchâtel alumni